Leavis is a surname, and may refer to:

 F. R. Leavis (1895–1978), British literary critic
 Q. D. Leavis (1906–1981), English literary critic and essayist

See also

 Beavis
 Leaves
 Leavisism, a form of literary studies named after F. R. Leavis
 Levis (disambiguation)